The 1960 German motorcycle Grand Prix was the fifth round of the 1960 Grand Prix motorcycle racing season. It took place on 23–24 July 1960 at the Solitude circuit.

500 cc classification

250 cc classification

Sidecar classification

References

German motorcycle Grand Prix
German
German Motorcycle Grand Prix
German Grand